The 175th Massachusetts General Court, consisting of the Massachusetts Senate and the Massachusetts House of Representatives, met in 1987 and 1988 during the governorship of Michael Dukakis. William Bulger served as president of the Senate and George Keverian served as speaker of the House.

Notable legislation included creation of the Massachusetts Environmental Trust.

Senators

Representatives

See also
 100th United States Congress
 List of Massachusetts General Courts

References

Further reading

External links
 
 
 
 
 
 
  (1964-1994)

Political history of Massachusetts
Massachusetts legislative sessions
massachusetts
1987 in Massachusetts
massachusetts
1988 in Massachusetts